The Hill is a neighborhood within St. Louis, Missouri, located on high ground south of Forest Park. The official boundaries of the area are Manchester Avenue (Route 100) on the north, Columbia and Southwest Avenues on the south, South Kingshighway Boulevard on the east, and Hampton Avenue on the west.

The Hill began with immigrants from Northern Italy, Germany, Ireland, and African-Americans who wanted to live near the railroad which connected the neighborhood to downtown. The vast numbers of Italians migrating to the area resulted in an Italian American majority population during the early part of the 20th century. Historically, it is a predominantly blue collar neighborhood.

Its name is due to its proximity to the highest point of the city, formerly named St. Louis Hill, which is outside the neighborhood's boundaries, a few blocks south, at the intersection of Arsenal Street and Sublette Avenue. The intersection borders Sublette Park, the former site of the Saint Louis Social Evil Hospital built there in 1873, where Josephine Baker was later born. Adjacent to the building of the former St. Louis County Lunatic Asylum built in 1864, now a rehabilitation center.

History
Various ethnic groups existed in the area in the mid-19th century. Italians, mainly from the north and especially from the northern Italian region of Lombardy, immigrated and settled in the area starting in the late 19th century, attracted by jobs in nearby plants established to exploit deposits of clay discovered by Irish immigrants in the 1830s.

Due to the increasing number of Italian speakers, the parish of St. Ambrose was founded by members of St. Aloysius Gonzaga Parish  in what later came to be known as the Hill in 1903 to serve primarily the recent Lombard immigrants.  After the first wooden church burned in 1924, a brick church was built in 1926. The structure, designed by architect Angelo Corrubia, was modeled after the Sant'Ambrogio Church in Milan, in a Lombard Romanesque Revival style of brick and terra cotta. Residents took pride in their parish and donated funds for the new church. It became a territorial parish of the Archdiocese of St Louis in 1955, after existing as a personal ethnic parish until that time.

Baseball greats Yogi Berra and Joe Garagiola Sr. grew up on the Hill; their boyhood homes are across the street from each other on Elizabeth Avenue.  Four of the five St. Louisans on the US soccer team that defeated England in the 1950 FIFA World Cup came from The Hill, a story that is told in The Game of Their Lives, a book and 2005 film of the same title (released on DVD as The Miracle Match).

According to Garagiola's book Baseball Is a Funny Game, during his youth, the Hill was called "Dago Hill," the term "dago", a disparaging and offensive term used to refer to a person of Italian descent. The Hill was also well known to African-Americans, for during the era of Prohibition and bootlegging, the area had an African-American enclave that produced a number of blues songs that referenced The Hill. Other talent from The Hill includes Toni Carroll who made a singing career in New York in the 1950s and 60s, appearing on Broadway and at the Copacabana. She appeared as a guest on "The Tonight Show" guest hosted by Garagiola and with special guest Yogi Berra. Hill native Ben Pucci played with the Cleveland Browns in the 1960s.

 In 1926, the blues singer Luella Miller recorded "Dago Hill Blues" about the area. 
 In 1929, the pseudonymous blues singer Freezone recorded "Indian Squaw Blues" in which he sang, "I'm gonna buy me a mansion, I'm gonna live on Dago's Hill / So I can get my whiskey, honey, right from the still." 
 In 1932, Tampa Red and Georgia Tom Dorsey sang of the Hill and its connection to illegal liquor in "You Can't Get That Stuff No More" – "stuff" being a reference to alcohol.
 In 1934, Charlie Patton mentioned the Hill in his single "Love My Stuff," a song in which "stuff" again means liquor. 
 In 1935, the North Carolina blues musician Blind Boy Fuller made reference to the Hill in his song "Log Cabin Blues".

Demographics and crime

In 2020 The Hill's racial makeup was 90.4% White, 2.5% Black, 0.2% Native American, 1.1% Asian, 4.5% Two or More Races, and 1.2% Some Other Race. 3.3% of the people were of Hispanic or Latino origin. On June 13, 2020, Black Lives Matter protests overtook the Hill as the neighborhood has struggled with racism and bigotry against African Americans. Reports surfaced that African-Americans were routinely being denied residency which has caused demonstrations and protests during the 2020 BLM riots. In 2020, total crime in the neighborhood has seen a 27.69% rise as the neighborhood has seen more vandalism, property crimes, rapes, and assaults.

Native-born Italians in St. Louis
As of 2022, there are approximately 2,000 native-born Italians residing throughout the St. Louis metropolitan region, with only a few living in The Hill neighborhood.  The Italian Community of St. Louis, an organization which promotes the Italian language and culture, has several popular events which include Carnevale which occurs in February and Ferragosto which occurs in August. The St. Louis Italian Language Program has its home on the Hill at Gateway Science Academy on Fyler Avenue.

Notable people
Yogi Berra, (1925–2015) was a professional baseball catcher, manager and coach. He played 19 seasons in Major League Baseball for New York Yankees and New York Mets.
Frank Borghi, (1925–2015) was a professional soccer player/goalkeeper for the USA national team.
Charlie Colombo, (1920–1986) was a professional soccer player for the United States men's national soccer team.
Joe Garagiola Sr., (1926–2016) was a professional baseball catcher, announcer and television host, popular for his colorful personality.
Gino Pariani, (1928–2007) was a professional soccer striker for the United States men's national soccer team,

See also
 Ozark Highlands AVA, winemaking region in Missouri started by Italian immigrants
 St. Louis cuisine
 Toasted ravioli, a local dish made from fried Italian ravioli

References

External links
 The Italian Community of St Louis (bilingual)
 Italian organizations in St. Louis (bilingual)
 St Louis Italian Language Program
 St Louis – Bologna Sister Cities
 The City of St. Louis Hill neighborhood website
 Hill2000.org |The Hill Neighborhood Association
 St. Ambrose Parish

Italian-American culture in Missouri
Little Italys in the United States
Neighborhoods in St. Louis